Midnight Creeper is an album by saxophonist Teddy Edwards which was recorded in 1997 and released on the HighNote label.

Reception

In his review on Allmusic, Scott Yanow states "52 years after his recording debut, Teddy Edwards proved to still be in his musical prime"

Track listing 
All compositions by Teddy Edwards except where noted
 "Midnight Creeper" – 7:30
 "Walking in the Rain" – 5:40
 "Sensitive" – 6:06
 "Oh, Lady Be Good!" (George Gershwin Ira Gershwin) – 10:34
 "Don't Blame Me" (Jimmy McHugh, Dorothy Fields) – 6:49
 "Sunday" (Chester Conn' Jule Styne, Benny Krueger Ned Miller) – 5:34
 "Tenderly" (Walter Gross, Jack Lawrence) – 9:44
 "Almost Like Being in Love" (Frederick Loewe, Alan Jay Lerner) – 5:29

Personnel 
 Teddy Edwards – tenor saxophone
 Virgil Jones – trumpet (tracks 1-3 & 6)
 Richard Wyands – piano
 Buster Williams – bass
 Chip White – drums

References 

Teddy Edwards albums
1997 albums
HighNote Records albums
Albums recorded at Van Gelder Studio